The Bohemian March may refer to either:
 the March of Moravia, a marcher state existing in various forms from 1182 to 1918
 the March of the Nordgau, a margraviate in the north of the duchy of Bavaria in the High Middle Ages